Liao Kuo-tung (born 8 January 1955) is a Taiwanese Amis politician. Also known by the Amis name Sufin Siluko, he has represented the Lowland Aborigine Constituency in the Legislative Yuan since 2002.

Early life and education
Liao Kuo-tung, of Amis descent, is also known by the name Sufin Siluko. Born in Taitung County, he attended Kaohsiung Medical University, obtaining a bachelor of medicine degree.

Political career
Upon the end of his term in the third National Assembly, Liao was elected to the Legislative Yuan. In 2011, he served as a member of the Kuomintang Central Standing Committee. Three years later, Liao was named deputy caucus whip. He faced Apollo Chen in a May 2016 election for KMT caucus leader, the first time the post was directly elected. Liao eventually assumed the position on 7 July.

2018 Taitung County magistrate election

Liu's Kuomintang membership was suspended in August 2020, after he was detained and questioned regarding a legal case involving allegations of bribery. The Taipei District Court ruled in July 2022 that Liao had violated the Anti-Corruption Act, sentenced him to eight years and six months imprisonment, and decided that he was to return NT$6.2 million in bribes.

References

Politicians of the Republic of China on Taiwan from Taitung County
1955 births
Living people
Aboriginal Members of the Legislative Yuan
Kuomintang Members of the Legislative Yuan in Taiwan
Members of the 5th Legislative Yuan
Members of the 6th Legislative Yuan
Members of the 7th Legislative Yuan
Members of the 8th Legislative Yuan
Members of the 9th Legislative Yuan
Kaohsiung Medical University alumni
Amis people
Members of the 10th Legislative Yuan
Taiwanese politicians convicted of corruption